Nirivilo (in Mapudungun: fox snake, a creature in the Mapuche mythology of Chile) is a hamlet (caserío) in San Javier commune, in the Chilean province of Linares, Maule Region. It offers some remarkable examples of typical Chilean rural architecture. Its parish church (now undergoing major repairs) dates from colonial times and is a National Monument.

Populated places in Linares Province